Tridrepana aequinota is a moth in the family Drepanidae. It was described by Allan Watson in 1957. It is found on Buru in Indonesia.

References

Moths described in 1957
Drepaninae
Moths of Indonesia